The Quetta Gladiators is a franchise cricket team that represents Quetta in Pakistan Super League. It was one of the six teams that competed in the 2020 season. Quetta Gladiators have previously lifted the PSL title for the first time in 2019, which makes them defending champion in 2020.

The team was captained by Sarfraz Ahmed, coached by Moin Khan and mentored by Viv Richards. Shane Watson was the team leading run-scorer while Mohammad Hasnain was leading wicket-taker.

The team won four of its ten fixtures and were eliminated for the first time in group stage.

Squad 
 Players with international caps are listed in bold.
Ages are given as of the first match of the season, 20 February 2020

Season standings

Season summary
Quetta Gladiators started their campaign by defeating Islamabad United by 3 wickets in the opening game of the tournament. In their second match, Quetta lost to Peshawar Zalmi by six wickets. The team won their next two matches against Karachi Kings and Islamabad United respectively, both by five wickets. Quetta then went on a losing streak, facing defeat in their next four matches. Their ninth match was abandoned due to rain. In their last match of the group stage, Quetta defeated Karachi Kings by 5 wickets equaling points with Peshawar Zalmi but failed to qualify for knockouts due to low run-rate. They finished on fifth and were eliminated from the tournament.

See also
 Islamabad United in 2020
 Karachi Kings in 2020
 Lahore Qalandars in 2020

References

2020 in Balochistan, Pakistan
2020 Pakistan Super League
Gladiators in 2020
2020